Salagena meyi is a moth in the family Cossidae. It is found in Namibia.

References

Natural History Museum Lepidoptera generic names catalog

Endemic fauna of Namibia
Metarbelinae
Moths described in 2007